Democratic Left Scotland is the continuation in Scotland of Democratic Left, the organisation formed when the Communist Party of Great Britain was dissolved in 1991. DLS was founded in May 1998.

While DLS's sister organisation in England and Wales later renamed itself the New Politics Network and has since merged into the think tank Unlock Democracy, DLS is still active as part of the left. It publishes an occasional magazine, Perspectives.

The organisation's slogan is "There's more to politics than parties", but some of its members do participate in other parties, such as the Scottish Socialist Party and Scottish Green Party, including Mark Ballard, former Green Party Member of the Scottish Parliament for Lothians. Two City of Edinburgh councillors are members of DLS.

References

External links
 https://web.archive.org/web/20061205055238/http://democraticleftscotland.org.uk/
 https://democraticleft.scot/

Organizations established in 1998
Political advocacy groups in Scotland
Political and economic think tanks based in the United Kingdom
Think tanks based in Scotland